Victor Willems (19 February 1877 – 1918) was a Belgian fencer. He won a bronze medal in the team épée event at the 1908 Summer Olympics and a gold in the same event at the 1912 Summer Olympics.

He was killed in action during World War I.

See also
 List of Olympians killed in World War I

References

External links
 

1877 births
1918 deaths
Belgian male épée fencers
Olympic fencers of Belgium
Olympic gold medalists for Belgium
Olympic bronze medalists for Belgium
Olympic medalists in fencing
Medalists at the 1908 Summer Olympics
Medalists at the 1912 Summer Olympics
Fencers at the 1908 Summer Olympics
Fencers at the 1912 Summer Olympics
Belgian military personnel killed in World War I